Boldenone undecylenate, or boldenone undecenoate, sold under the brand names Equipoise and Parenabol among others, is an androgen and anabolic steroid (AAS) medication which is used in veterinary medicine, mainly in horses. It was formerly used in humans as well. It is given by injection into muscle.

Side effects of boldenone undecylenate include symptoms of masculinization like acne, increased hair growth, voice changes, and increased sexual desire. The drug is a synthetic androgen and anabolic steroid and hence is an agonist of the androgen receptor (AR), the biological target of androgens like testosterone and dihydrotestosterone (DHT). It has strong anabolic effects and moderate androgenic effects, weak estrogenic effects, and no risk of liver damage. Boldenone undecylenate is an androgen ester and a long-lasting prodrug of boldenone in the body.

Boldenone undecylenate was introduced for medical use in the 1960s. In addition to its medical use, boldenone undecylenate is used to improve physique and performance. The drug is a controlled substance in the United States and its use is generally illicit. It remains marketed for veterinary use in Australia and the United States.

Uses

Veterinary
Boldenone undecylenate is used in veterinary medicine, mainly in horses.

Clinical
Boldenone undecylenate was formerly used in clinical medicine in humans, but was discontinued. The drug is currently not approved by Food and Drug Administration. It is also classified as DEA Schedule III controlled substance.

Side effects

Pharmacology

Pharmacodynamics
Boldenone undecylenate is a prodrug of boldenone, and hence is an agonist of the androgen receptor. Boldenone has strong anabolic effects and moderate androgenic effects. It also has low estrogenic activity and has little or no progestogenic activity. In relation to the fact that it is not 17α-alkylated, boldenone and boldenone undecylenate have little or no risk of hepatotoxicity.

Pharmacokinetics
Boldenone undecylenate is a prodrug of boldenone. When administered via intramuscular injection, a depot is formed from which boldenone undecylenate is slowly released into the body and then transformed into boldenone. The drug possess a biological half-life of 14 days when administered by intramuscular injection. Boldenone is a substrate for 5α-reductase and may be converted by this enzyme into 1-testosterone (δ1-dihydrotestosterone, δ1-DHT, dihydroboldenone) in tissues that express it such as the skin, hair follicles, and prostate gland. However, its affinity for this enzyme is said to be extremely low.

Chemistry

Boldenone undecylenate, or boldenone 17β-undec-10-enoate, is a synthetic androstane steroid and a derivative of testosterone. It is the C17β undecylenate (undecenoate) ester of boldenone (δ1-testosterone, 1-dehydrotestosterone, or androsta-1,4-dien-17β-ol-3-one), which itself is the C1(2) dehydrogenated analogue of testosterone and a naturally occurring androgen found in the scent gland of Ilybius fenestratus (a species of aquatic beetle). Boldenone is the non-17α-alkylated variant of metandienone (17α-methyl-δ1-testosterone). An AAS related to boldenone undecylenate is quinbolone (δ1-testosterone 17β-cyclopentenyl enol ether).

History
Boldenone was reportedly patented by Ciba in 1949, and esters of the compound were developed by the company in the 1950s and 1960s. One such ester, boldenone undecylenate, was introduced for clinical use as an injectable AAS under the brand name Parenabol in the 1960s. However, it was discontinued for use in humans in the late 1970s. Squibb introduced boldenone undecylenate for veterinary use under the brand name Equipoise. The medication has been used much more widely in veterinary medicine, in which it has been used mainly in horses, and remains in use today.

Society and culture

Generic names
Boldenone undecylenate is the generic name of the drug and its , while boldenone undecenoate is its .

Brand names
Boldenone undecylenate is or has been marketed under a number of brand names including Boldane, Equipoise, Parenabol, and Vebonol among others.

Availability
Boldenone undecylenate remains marketed for veterinary use in Australia and the United States.

Doping in sports

There are many known cases of doping in sports with boldenone undecylenate by professional athletes.

References

External links
 Equipoise (boldenone undecylenate) - William Llewellyn's Anabolic.org

Androgens and anabolic steroids
Androstanes
Androgen esters
Conjugated dienes
Equine medications
Enones
Prodrugs
Synthetic estrogens
Undecylenate esters
World Anti-Doping Agency prohibited substances